Saudi Arabia participated at the 2018 Asian Para Games which was held in Jakarta, Indonesia from 6 to 13 October 2018. Saudi Arabian delegation was composed of 27 athletes who competed in 3 sports, namely athletics, powerlifting and wheelchair basketball. All its medals were won in the sport of athletics.

Medalist

Medal by Sport

Medalist

See also
 Saudi Arabia at the 2018 Asian Games

References

Nations at the 2018 Asian Para Games
2018 in Saudi Arabian sport